Harold Godbold (born 31 January 1939) was an English professional footballer who played as a winger for Sunderland.

References

1939 births
People from Springwell Village
Footballers from Tyne and Wear
English footballers
Association football wingers
Sunderland A.F.C. players
Hartlepool United F.C. players
Boston United F.C. players
Boston Town F.C. players
Lincoln City F.C. players
Spalding United F.C. players
Gateshead F.C. players
English Football League players
Living people